Hyundai Amco Co. Ltd., was a Korean construction company founded in October 2002 in Yangjae-dong Seocho-gu Seoul, South Korea. Currently, the company's CEO is Kim Chang Hee. AMCO is licensed by the Hyundai Motor Company, and its main line of business is construction products. The company researches new technologies such as the modularization method, and floating dock technology.

Business products
Construction
Civil
Overseas
Housing
Facility Management

Projects
2002: Kia Motors Hwaseong plant construction.
2003: Hyundai Motor Company – Namyang Design Center construction, Jeju Haevichi Resort condominium construction, Hyundai Motor Company Jeonju plant full-construction.
2004: Kia Motors Hwaseong Plant inner gymnasium construction.
2005: Hyundai Kia Motors research center full-construction, and Namyang Rollinghills construction.
2006: Hyundai Motor Manufacturing Czech Plant, in Nosovice, Czech Republic.

See also
Hyundai Motor Company
Hyundai Kia Automotive Group

References

External links
AMCO Constructions Official Homepage 

Building And Construction Products Information Resource

Construction and civil engineering companies of South Korea
Hyundai Motor Group
South Korean companies established in 2002
Construction and civil engineering companies established in 2002